The Fiji women's national rugby union team are a national sporting side of Fiji, representing them at rugby union. They played their first test against Samoa in 2006, and compete annually in the Oceania Rugby Women's Championship. In 2022, they created history when they scored the third-highest points in both Men's and Women's Rugby at the Oceania Championship when they trounced Papua New Guinea 152–0. They made their first Rugby World Cup appearance at the delayed tournament in New Zealand.

History
Fiji played their first match in 1997 against a visiting United States XV's team. They played their first international test match against Samoa in the one-off Women's Pacific Tri-Nations in 2006.

Ten years after the Women's Pacific Tri-Nations, the Oceania Rugby Women's Championship was established. The first tournament was held in 2016 between Fiji and Papua New Guinea at the ANZ National Stadium in Suva. The tournament was also part of the 2017 Women's Rugby World Cup qualification process. Fiji beat Papua New Guinea 37–10 to win the inaugural Oceania Championship and progress to the next stage of qualifications.

Fiji met Hong Kong and Japan in a Repechage tournament, but lost both matches and did not qualify for the 2017 World Cup.

In 2018, Fijiana won the second edition of the Oceania Championship and successfully defended their title after winning all their matches. 

The 2019 Oceania Championship also served as a qualifier for the 2021 Rugby World Cup in New Zealand. It was also the first time that the Oceania region was granted a spot at the World Cup. New Zealand and Australia had already qualified from the previous World Cup, Fijiana won the remaining spot and qualified for their first World Cup. 

Fiji played two test matches against Australia and Japan in 2022 at Brisbane. It would be their first test match against the Wallaroos and only their second time to meet Japan. Fiji won the 2022 Oceania Rugby Championship in New Zealand. They created history when they scored the third-highest points in both Men's and Women's Rugby at the 2022 Oceania Championships as they trounced Papua New Guinea 152–0 in Papakura, New Zealand.

In 2022, Fijiana were overwhelmed in their first Rugby World Cup match by England who ran in 14 tries and recorded an 84–19 victory. They later achieved their first World Cup win when they defeated South Africa 21–17. Their win against the Springbok Women moved them up five places to their highest ranking of 16th from 21st. France kept Fiji scoreless in their last World Cup match with a score of 44–0.

Records

Rugby World Cup

Overall

(Full internationals only, updated to 16 October 2022)

Players
Fijiana's 32-player squad to the 2021 Rugby World Cup in New Zealand.

Coaches

See also

Fiji women's national rugby sevens team

References

External links
 Fiji Rugby Official site

 
Oceanian national women's rugby union teams